Peter Jenkins is a former British diplomat.

Early career

Born in 1950 in Buckinghamshire, England. Education: Downside School, Somerset (five A Levels); Corpus Christi College, University of Cambridge (M.A.); Graduate School of Arts and Sciences, Harvard University. Peter joined the British Diplomatic Service in 1973, having graduated from the University of Cambridge with a degree in Classical Philosophy, and having spent two years at the Harvard Graduate School for Arts and Sciences as a Harkness Fellow. His 33-year diplomatic career took him to Vienna (twice), Washington, D.C., Paris, Brasília and Geneva.
 
In Washington, he was Private Secretary to two Ambassadors during an eventful period in transatlantic and East/West relations, as well as the Falklands War (1982–84). During three spells in the FCO prior to 1987. he had responsibility for aspects of the Irish question, relations with Brazil and the Andean countries, and Diplomatic Service assignments below the grade of Counsellor. In Paris, he dealt with issues arising from the creation of a European single market and worked on Franco-British energy ties.

After a spell in Brasilia, where he contributed to strengthening Anglo-Brazilian political and economic relations, as Brazil began its recovery from two decades of hyperinflation (1992–95), he became the UK's chief representative to the  World Trade Organisation in Geneva. There he lobbied for a further round of global trade negotiations, participated in trade policy reviews, chaired the WTO's Balance of Payments Committee, and helped to set up the Advisory Centre on WTO Law.

Ambassador to IAEA and on to mediation

In 2001, he was made Ambassador to the International Atomic Energy Agency and other UN organisations at Vienna. There his primary focus was on the nuclear aspects of international peace and security, especially the Iranian nuclear issue, at a point when the nuclear talks between Iran and the European Union appeared to hold promise, but were stymied by elements within the Bush Administration.

On leaving the Diplomatic Service in 2006 he worked as a special representative for the Renewable Energy and Energy Efficiency Partnership in Vienna, and as an adviser to the director of the International Institute for Applied Systems Analysis, a global public policy research institute, before qualifying as a civil and commercial mediator. Since 2010 he has been a partner in The Ambassador Partnership LLP, a cross-border dispute settlement and problem-solving partnership. He also writes and speaks on international nuclear and trade policy issues. From 2010 to 2012 he was an associate fellow of the Geneva Centre for Security Policy.

Negotiations over Iran's nuclear programme

Peter was active within the international movement supporting negotiations with Iran and seeking diplomatic solutions that respect Iran's rights to a civil nuclear power industry but that also restrain it from achieving a nuclear weapon capability. In an article in the Telegraph in January 2012 he expressed concern that imposing ever tighter sanctions on Iran required an exaggeration of the Iranian nuclear threat which fuelled the scare-mongering of those who wanted sanctions to be a mere step on the way to war. He argued that sanctions were a disproportionate response to a state acting on its right to enrich uranium and that Iran's uranium enrichment programme should be handled in accordance with the Nuclear Non-Proliferation Treaty (NPT).  He lamented that far too many American politicians saw advantage in whipping up fear of Iran and would sneer that the NPT was for wimps.

In September 2013 he co-authored an article in the Christian Science Monitor with Robert Hunter, US ambassador to NATO in the mid-90s. They argued that the election of Dr Hassan Rouhani as president of Iran presented an opportunity for the West to review its position in the nuclear negotiations with Iran that had got under way in April 2012. Instead of requiring Iran to dismantle its uranium enrichment programme (as demanded by Israel) or reduce the number of centrifuges at its disposal to a few thousand, the West should ask Iran to volunteer confidence-building demonstrations of peaceful intent during a transition to full enjoyment of its right to make peaceful use of nuclear technologies.  The West should also focus its efforts on influencing Iranian cost/benefit calculations, as recommended in US national intelligence estimates, and build on Iran's interest in preserving the nuclear non-proliferation regime.

Accusation during a debate on Iran

In 2012, during a debate at Warwick University, Peter Jenkins was accused of anti-semitism for stating that it seemed that Jews and Christians no longer shared the idea that a just war requires the use of force to be proportionate. In the debate, Jenkins, Opposed in the debate by representatives of the Foundation for the Defence of Democracy and the Henry Jackson Society, he spoke successfully in proposition to the motion "this house would rather a nuclear armed Iran than war", explaining that diplomacy could avert both war and Iranian acquisition of nuclear weapons. The Chief executive of the Board of Deputies of British Jews subsequently opined that "he clearly sees Jews as having different moral compass that is irreconcilable with the Christian West. This is grossly offensive and palpable nonsense". In a letter to the editor of the Jewish Chronicle, Peter Jenkins apologised for any offence he might have given and explained that his intention had been to draw attention to the tendency of the Jewish state of Israel to make disproportionate use of force, contrary to just war doctrine.

Report about Public Opposition to First Use of Nuclear Weapons
Since 2017 Peter Jenkins has been chairman of the executive committee of British Pugwash, a branch of Pugwash International Conferences on Science and World Affairs. In that capacity, during November 2021, he reported in the Bulletin of the Atomic Scientists that British Pugwash had commissioned a survey of public opinion in the United Kingdom which revealed that two-thirds of the public were opposed to NATO being the first to use nuclear weapons in the event of Russia invading one or more of the Baltic states without resorting to nuclear weapons. He went on to question the British government’s belief that threatening the first use of nuclear weapons was a credible way of deterring non-nuclear threats to NATO, and to point out that, once  one of two nuclear-armed states resorts to nuclear weapons,  there is no empirical evidence for supposing that nuclear escalation, leading to catastrophe, can be avoided. He urged diplomatic engagement to produce a balance of NATO and Russian non-nuclear forces in theatres where NATO fears Russian aggression and, if necessary, an increase in spending on non-nuclear defences in place of reliance on nuclear first use.

Languages
He speaks French, German and Portuguese.

Family
He is married with two children. He was made a Companion in the Order of St. Michael and St. George in 2005.

References

1950 births
Living people
British diplomats
Companions of the Order of St Michael and St George